The 1932 Wakefield by-election was held on 21 April 1932.  The by-election was held due to the death of the incumbent Conservative MP, George Brown Hillman.  It was won by the Labour candidate Arthur Greenwood.

References

1932 in England
Elections in Wakefield
1932 elections in the United Kingdom
By-elections to the Parliament of the United Kingdom in West Yorkshire constituencies
1930s in Yorkshire